Peru competed at the 2013 World Games held in Cali, Colombia.

Medalists

Karate 

Isabel Aco won the bronze medal in the women's kumite +68 kg event.

Squash 

Diego Elías competed in the men's singles event.

References 

Nations at the 2013 World Games
2013 in Peruvian sport
2013